Eduard Krüger may refer to:
 Eduard Krüger (architect) (1901–1967), German architect
 Eduard Krüger (equestrian) (1893–1963), German equestrian
 Eduard Krüger (politician) (fl. 1926), Estonian politician 
 Eduard Krüger (music historian) (1807–1885), German musicologist, composer and philologist